Diaso is a town in the Central region of Ghana. The Diaso Senior High School is located in the town.  The school is a second cycle institution. Diaso is the capital of Asenkye kingdom of Denkyira with Odeneho Agyaa Ameyaw II from the Kona royal family as the king.

References

Populated places in the Central Region (Ghana)
Villages in Ghana